Caterina Appiani (1398 – 19 December 1451) was the lady of Piombino of the Appiani dynasty from 1445 until her death.

She was born at Piombino, the first daughter of Gherardo Appiani, lord of that principality. She succeeded her mother Paola Colonna thanks to the army of her husband, the condottiero Rinaldo Orsini, whom she had married in 1440 and who had already supported her mother. When Rinaldo died, Caterina was forced to leave Piombino to her uncle Emanuele Appiani.

She died in 1451 at Scarlino.

References

 Mauro Carrara, Signori e principi di Piombino, Bandecchi & Vivaldi, Pontedera 1996.

1398 births
1451 deaths
Caterina
People from Piombino
Lords of Piombino
15th-century women rulers
15th-century Italian women